Thru the Mirror is a Mickey Mouse cartoon short film produced by Walt Disney Productions and released by United Artists in 1936. In this cartoon short, Mickey has a Through the Looking-Glass-type dream that he travels through his mirror and enters a topsy-turvy world where everything is alive. While there, he engages in a Fred Astaire dance number with a pair of gloves and a pack of cards, until the cards chase him out of the bizarre world. It was the 83rd Mickey Mouse short film to be released, the fourth of that year.

The title is written as Thru the Mirror on the title card, but the alternative spelling Through the Mirror is used on the poster for the film.

Plot
Mickey falls asleep after reading Lewis Carroll's 1871 novel Through the Looking-Glass and dreams that he passes through a mirror above a fireplace into an alternate reality. Beyond the mirror, his furniture and possessions have come to life and he clumsily tangles with a rocking chair, a footrest and an umbrella. Mickey eats a walnut offered to him by a nutcracker and it causes his lower body to spin around crazily. It also causes him to crazily grow until his head hits the ceiling, and then suddenly shrink to a tiny size.

The telephone answers itself and hauls Mickey up to the top of a desk with its cord. After a fruitless conversation, the phone uses its cord to amuse Mickey with a game of jump rope. The skipping turns into a tap dance, and the radio turns itself on to play a tune. Grabbing a tiny top hat and a matchstick for a cane, Mickey performs a tap dance routine, using a regular-size top hat as his platform. He has another dance scene with a pair of gloves, in which Mickey's buttocks get kicked three times, and then he becomes the leader of a marching set of playing cards. Mickey gets shuffled into the pack and he gets his buttocks hit by the cards, which turns into another dance routine.

Mickey dances with the Queen of Hearts (Appearance inspired by Greta Garbo) until the King of Hearts (Appearance inspired by Charles Laughton as Henry VIII) notices and slaps Mickey for his insolence. Mickey and the King have a furious swordfight, with Mickey using a straight pin as a sword after the King pushes him and gets his buttocks stabbed by the pin. He dunks the King into the inkwell, which infuriates him. After a stamp takes the King out and cleans him, he calls the cards, and the radio acts as an alarm in response to this. A swarm of cards emerge from the King's throne, followed by another set from a nearby desk drawer, jump to attention and begin to chase Mickey. Mickey hides in the sewing basket and uses a fountain pen to drench the cards in ink as a machine gun, but there are too many of them. The pen eventually runs out of ink, allowing the cards to pig-pile on Mickey. Mickey escapes in a torn sock but is spotted. Another chase occurs, with the cards throwing their pictures at Mickey, but the mouse uses an electric fan to blow them all away.

The telephone starts yelping for the police, and Mickey runs away as the telephone rings and rings. Swinging from a lamp cord (causing the lamp to turn on and off in the process) and then speeding across a globe, he trips and falls into the sea, until he's ejected by an angry King Neptune by impaling Mickey's buttocks. He regains his normal size in time to run back through the mirror, returning to the real world and rejoining his sleeping self. The ringing turns out to be Mickey's alarm clock, which a sleepy Mickey throws into a drawer and then goes back to sleep.

Releases
 1936 – theatrical release
 1956 – Disneyland, episode #3.8: "The Plausible Impossible" (TV)
 c. 1972 – The Mouse Factory, episode #27: "Mickey Mouse" (TV)
 c. 1983 – Good Morning, Mickey!, episode #4 (TV)
 c. 1992 – Mickey's Mouse Tracks, episode #52 (TV)
 1997 – The Ink and Paint Club, episode #1.50: "Storyteller Mickey" (TV)
 2011 – Have a Laugh!, episode #23 (TV)

Home media
The short was released on December 4, 2001 on Walt Disney Treasures: Mickey Mouse in Living Color.

Additional releases include:
 1981 – "Mickey Mouse and Donald Duck Cartoon Collections Volume One" (VHS)
 c. 1988 – Mickey's Magical World, (VHS)
 1998 – "The Spirit of Mickey" (VHS)
 2004/2011 – Bonus on DVD release of Alice in Wonderland (DVD)
 2009 – Walt Disney Animation Collection: Mickey and the Beanstalk (DVD)
 2012 – Have a Laugh!: Volume 5 (DVD)
 2018 – Celebrating Mickey (Blu-ray/DVD/Digital)
 2023 – Mickey & Minnie: 10 Classic Shorts - Volume 1 (Blu-ray/DVD/Digital)

Legacy
 This cartoon was featured, and referenced, in the 2002 video game Disney's Magical Mirror Starring Mickey Mouse.
 Some elements from the cartoon like the cards and the opening were used in Epic Mickey.
 The song during the magic gloves dance scene was used for the Walt Disney Mini Classics promos during their movie's end.
 The melody during Mickey’s marching with the cards in the middle of the film is a jazzed-up version of the music used in another 1932 cartoon classic, Santa’s Workshop. The music theme is based on Franz Schubert: Military March Op. 51 No. 1, in D Major.

See also
Mickey Mouse (film series)

References

External links
 

1936 films
1930s color films
1936 animated films
1930s Disney animated short films
Mickey Mouse short films
Animated films based on Alice in Wonderland
Films directed by David Hand
Films produced by Walt Disney
Films about dreams
Films about parallel universes
Films scored by Frank Churchill
Films scored by Leigh Harline
Films scored by Paul Smith (film and television composer)
Neptune (mythology)
1930s American films